
Gmina Telatyn is a rural gmina (administrative district) in Tomaszów Lubelski County, Lublin Voivodeship, in eastern Poland.

Villages
Gmina Telatyn contains the villages and settlements of Bazarek, Dutrów, Franusin, Korea, Kryniczka, Kryszyn, Łachowce, Łykoszyn, Majdan, Marysin, Nowosiółki, Posadów, Poturzyn, Radków, Radków-Kolonia, Suszów, Telatyn, Wasylów and Żulice.

Neighbouring gminas
Gmina Telatyn is bordered by the gminas of Dołhobyczów, Łaszczów, Mircze and Ulhówek.

References

Polish official population figures 2006

Telatyn
Tomaszów Lubelski County